This article is the statistics of the Úrvalsdeild league for the 1986 season.

Overview
It was contested by 10 teams, and Fram won the championship. Fram's Guðmundur Torfason was the top scorer with 19 goals

League standings

Results
Each team played every opponent once home and away for a total of 18 matches.

References

Úrvalsdeild karla (football) seasons
Iceland
Iceland
1